Enchanters may refer to:

 Enchanters Three, a set of comic book characters
 Enchanters (Detroit doo-wop band)
 The Enchanters, a vocal group formed by Garnet Mimms in 1961
 The Enchanters, Chicago-based quintet on the Okeh label led by Billy Butler (singer)

See also
 Enchanter (disambiguation)
 Enchantress (disambiguation)